The 2015 season was São Paulo's 86th year since the club's existence. At the first half of the year, São Paulo played the Campeonato Paulista and Copa Libertadores. In the state league the club's performance led to semifinals when The Dearest lose to rival Santos in a single match on away field (1-2). By the continental tournament, Tricolor reach the round of 16 being beaten by Cruzeiro in penalty shootouts by 3-4 after two equal scores (1-0 home; 0–1 away). In April, Muricy Ramalho left the São Paulo FC due to health problems and the team was trained by assistant coach Milton Cruz during a few matches and managed by Colombian Juan Carlos Osorio and Brazilian Doriva in the course of the season. After only 7 matches Doriva was replaced by Milton Cruz who trained the club again at the end of the year. In the Copa do Brasil, Tricolor was defeated by Santos in semifinals with two losses by 1–3, 2–6 on aggregate score. By national league a final 4th position take a place in the first stage of the Copa Libertadores. The main event of the year was the retirement of goalkeeper Rogério Ceni in a symbolical match between the world champions players by São Paulo in 1992 and 2005. The final result was 5–3 to 2005 champions. Rogério Ceni stopped his career at 42 with a record of 1237 matches, 131 goals during his 23 seasons by Tricolor.

Players

Out on loan

Transfers

In

Out

Statistics

Appearances and goals

|-
|colspan="14" style="text-align:center;" |Players who are on loan/left São Paulo this season:

|-
|}

Top scorers

Disciplinary record
{| class="wikitable" style="font-size: 95%; text-align: center;"
|-
| rowspan="2"  style="width:5%; text-align:center;"|
| rowspan="2"  style="width:5%; text-align:center;"|
| rowspan="2"  style="width:5%; text-align:center;"|
| rowspan="2"  style="width:15%; text-align:center;"|Player
| colspan="3" style="text-align:center;"|Campeonato Paulista
| colspan="3" style="text-align:center;"|Copa Libertadores
| colspan="3" style="text-align:center;"|Campeonato Brasileiro
| colspan="3" style="text-align:center;"|Copa do Brasil
| colspan="3" style="text-align:center;"|Total
|-
!  style="width:60px; background:#fe9;"| 
!  style="width:60px; background:#ff8888;"|
!  style="width:60px; background:#ff8888;"|
!  style="width:60px; background:#fe9;"|
!  style="width:60px; background:#ff8888;"|
!  style="width:60px; background:#ff8888;"|
!  style="width:60px; background:#fe9;"|
!  style="width:60px; background:#ff8888;"|
!  style="width:60px; background:#ff8888;"|
!  style="width:60px; background:#fe9;"|
!  style="width:60px; background:#ff8888;"|
!  style="width:60px; background:#ff8888;"|
!  style="width:60px; background:#fe9;"|
!  style="width:60px; background:#ff8888;"|
!  style="width:60px; background:#ff8888;"|
|-
|GK
|
|01
|Rogério Ceni
|0
|0
|0
|0
|0
|0
|1
|0
|0
|0
|0
|0
|1
|0
|0
|-
|DF
|
|3
|Rodrigo Caio
|1
|0
|0
|0
|0
|0
|3
|0
|0
|0
|0
|0
|4
|0
|0
|-
|DF
|
|4
|Matheus Reis
|0
|0
|0
|0
|0
|0
|2
|1
|0
|1
|0
|0
|3
|1
|0
|-
|DF
|
|6
|Carlinhos
|0
|0
|0
|1
|0
|0
|2
|0
|0
|0
|0
|0
|3
|0
|0
|-
|MF
|
|7
|Michel Bastos
|2
|0
|1
|1
|0
|0
|4
|0
|0
|1
|0
|0
|8
|0
|1
|-
|FW
|
|9
|Luís Fabiano
|1
|0
|0
|1
|1
|0
|6
|1
|0
|2
|0
|0
|10
|2
|0
|-
|MF
|
|10
|Paulo Henrique Ganso
|3
|0
|0
|2
|0
|0
|6
|1
|0
|0
|0
|0
|11
|1
|0
|-
|FW
|
|11
|Alexandre Pato
|0
|0
|0
|0
|0
|0
|4
|0
|0
|1
|0
|0
|5
|0
|0
|-
|GK
|
|12
|Denis
|0
|0
|0
|0
|0
|0
|0
|0
|0
|0
|0
|0
|0
|0
|0
|-
|FW
|
|13
|Wilder Guisao
|0
|0
|0
|0
|0
|0
|1
|0
|0
|1
|0
|0
|2
|0
|0
|-
|FW
|
|14
|Alan Kardec
|0
|0
|0
|0
|0
|0
|2
|0
|0
|0
|0
|0
|2
|0
|0
|-
|DF
|
|16
|Reinaldo
|3
|0
|0
|3
|0
|0
|1
|1
|0
|2
|0
|0
|9
|1
|0
|-
|FW
|
|17
|Rogério
|0
|0
|0
|0
|0
|0
|1
|0
|0
|0
|0
|0
|1
|0
|0
|-
|MF
|
|19
|Wesley
|1
|0
|0
|0
|0
|0
|4
|0
|0
|0
|0
|0
|5
|0
|0
|-
|FW
|
|20
|Ricardo Centurión
|1
|0
|0
|0
|0
|0
|0
|0
|0
|1
|0
|0
|2
|0
|0
|-
|DF
|
|21
|Edson Silva
|1
|0
|0
|0
|0
|0
|2
|0
|0
|0
|0
|0
|3
|0
|0
|-
|DF
|
|22
|Bruno
|3
|0
|0
|1
|0
|0
|5
|0
|0
|0
|0
|0
|9
|0
|0
|-
|MF
|
|23
|Thiago Mendes
|2
|0
|0
|0
|0
|0
|8
|0
|0
|3
|0
|0
|13
|0
|0
|-
|MF
|
|25
|Hudson
|3
|0
|0
|3
|0
|0
|7
|0
|0
|0
|0
|0
|13
|0
|0
|-
|DF
|
|26
|Luiz Eduardo
|0
|0
|0
|0
|0
|0
|2
|0
|1
|1
|0
|0
|3
|0
|1
|-
|DF
|
|27
|Auro Jr.
|1
|0
|0
|0
|0
|0
|1
|0
|0
|0
|0
|0
|2
|0
|0
|-
|GK
|
|28
|Renan Ribeiro
|0
|0
|0
|0
|0
|0
|3
|0
|0
|0
|0
|0
|3
|0
|0
|-
|MF
|
|29
|Daniel
|0
|0
|0
|0
|0
|0
|0
|0
|0
|0
|0
|0
|0
|0
|0
|-
|DF
|
|30
|Lucão
|1
|0
|0
|0
|0
|0
|0
|0
|0
|2
|0
|0
|3
|0
|0
|-
|DF
|
|33
|Breno
|0
|0
|0
|0
|0
|0
|1
|0
|0
|0
|0
|0
|1
|0
|0
|-
|DF
|
|34
|Lyanco
|0
|0
|0
|0
|0
|0
|1
|0
|0
|0
|0
|0
|1
|0
|0
|-
|MF
|
|36
|João Schmidt
|0
|0
|0
|0
|0
|0
|0
|0
|0
|0
|0
|0
|0
|0
|0
|-
|FW
|
|37
|João Paulo
|0
|0
|0
|0
|0
|0
|0
|0
|0
|0
|0
|0
|0
|0
|0
|-
|GK
|
|40
|Léo
|0
|0
|0
|0
|0
|0
|0
|0
|0
|0
|0
|0
|0
|0
|0
|-
|colspan="19"|Players who are on loan/left São Paulo this season:
|-
|DF
|
|2
|Rafael Toloi
|3
|0
|1
|0
|0
|0
|1
|0
|0
|0
|0
|0
|4
|0
|1
|-
|DF
|
|4
|Antônio Carlos
|0
|0
|0
|0
|0
|0
|0
|0
|0
|0
|0
|0
|0
|0
|0
|-
|MF
|
|5
|Souza
|3
|0
|0
|1
|0
|0
|1
|0
|0
|0
|0
|0
|5
|0
|0
|-
|MF
|
|8
|Boschilia
|1
|0
|0
|0
|0
|0
|0
|0
|0
|0
|0
|0
|1
|0
|0
|-
|DF
|
|13
|Paulo Miranda
|0
|0
|0
|0
|0
|0
|2
|0
|0
|0
|0
|0
|2
|0
|0
|-
|MF
|
|15
|Denílson
|4
|0
|0
|5
|0
|0
|2
|0
|0
|0
|0
|0
|11
|0
|0
|-
|FW
|
|17
|Jonathan Cafu
|0
|0
|0
|0
|0
|0
|0
|0
|0
|0
|0
|0
|0
|0
|0
|-
|MF
|
|18
|Maicon
|0
|0
|0
|0
|0
|0
|0
|0
|0
|0
|0
|0
|0
|0
|0
|-
|FW
|
|19
|Ademilson
|0
|0
|0
|0
|0
|0
|0
|0
|0
|0
|0
|0
|0
|0
|0
|-
|DF
|
|26
|Dória
|1
|0
|0
|3
|0
|0
|0
|0
|0
|0
|0
|0
|4
|0
|0
|-
|FW
|
|29
|Ewandro
|0
|0
|0
|0
|0
|0
|0
|0
|0
|0
|0
|0
|0
|0
|0
|-
| colspan=4 | TOTAL
|35
|0
|2
|21
|1
|0
|73
|4
|1
|15
|0
|0
|144
|5
|3
|-

Clean sheets
Includes all competitive matches. The list is sorted by shirt number when total clean sheets are equal.

Last updated on 6 December

Squad number changes

Managers performance

Milton Cruz replaces Osorio in the match against Atlético Paranaense and Cruzeiro.

Overview
{|class="wikitable"
|-
|Games played || 69 (17 Campeonato Paulista, 8 Copa Libertadores, 38 Campeonato Brasileiro, 6 Copa do Brasil)
|-
|Games won || 36 (11 Campeonato Paulista, 5 Copa Libertadores, 18 Campeonato Brasileiro, 2 Copa do Brasil)
|-
|Games drawn || 11 (2 Campeonato Paulista, 0 Copa Libertadores, 8 Campeonato Brasileiro, 1 Copa do Brasil)
|-
|Games lost || 22 (4 Campeonato Paulista, 3 Copa Libertadores, 12 Campeonato Brasileiro, 3 Copa do Brasil)
|-
|Goals scored || 107
|-
|Goals conceded || 73
|-
|Goal difference || +34
|-
|Clean sheets || 31
|-
|Yellow cards || 144 (35 Campeonato Paulista, 21 Copa Libertadores, 73 Campeonato Brasileiro, 15 Copa do Brasil)
|-
|Second yellow cards || 5 (0 Campeonato Paulista, 1 Copa Libertadores, 4 Campeonato Brasileiro, 0 Copa do Brasil)
|-
|Red cards || 3 (2 Campeonato Paulista, 0 Copa Libertadores, 1 Campeonato Brasileiro, 0 Copa do Brasil)
|-
|Worst discipline || Luís Fabiano (10 , 2 , 0 )
|-
|Best result || 5–0 (A) v Bragantino - Campeonato Paulista
|-
|Worst result || 1–6 (A) v Corinthians - Campeonato Brasileiro
|-
|Most appearances || Alexandre Pato (59)
|-
|Top scorer || Alexandre Pato (26)
|-

Friendlies

Torneio Super Series

Competitions

Campeonato Paulista

Results summary

Group A

First stage

Knockout stage

Copa Libertadores

Results Summary

Group stage

Knockout stage

Round of 16

Campeonato Brasileiro

Results summary

Results by round

Matches

Copa do Brasil

Results Summary

Round of 16

Quarter-finals

Semi-finals

References

External links
official website 

São Paulo FC seasons
Sao Paulo F.C.